

Arts, entertainment, and media
 Your Diary (visual novel)
 Your Diary, a song by Franz Ferdinand on the B-side of the single Do You Want To